Estosadok, sometimes spelled Esto-Sadok or Estosadoc ( or ; , lit.

It is the location of the alpine ski resort Alpika-Service. Roza Khutor railway station connects this area with Adler railway station, with further connections to Sochi International Airport, Sochi Olympic Village, and central Sochi.

References

External links

Rural localities in Krasnodar Krai
Ski areas and resorts in Russia
Adlersky City District
Estonian diaspora